Paul Harding may refer to:

Paul Harding (Australian rules footballer) (born 1964), English-born Australian rules footballer
Paul Harding (English footballer) (born 1964), English association football (soccer) player
Paul Harding, pen-name for English writer Paul C. Doherty (born 1946)
Paul Harding (author) (born 1967), American author, previously drummer for Cold Water Flat
Paul "El Hornet" Harding, DJ and co-founder of Australian-British drum and bass band Pendulum
Paul Harding High School, a high school in northeast Indiana that was closed in 2011.

See also
Paul Hardin (disambiguation)